The 2015–16 Iowa State Cyclones men's basketball team represents Iowa State University during the 2015–16 NCAA Division I men's basketball season. The Cyclones were coached by Steve Prohm, who was in his 1st season. They played their home games at Hilton Coliseum in Ames, Iowa and competed in the Big 12 Conference.

They finished the season 23–12 10–8 in Big 12 play to finish tied for 5th place.  They lost to Oklahoma in the quarterfinals of the Big 12 Conference tournament. They received an at-large bid to the NCAA tournament where they defeated Iona and Little Rock to advance to the Sweet Sixteen where they lost to Virginia.

Previous season

Iowa State finished the season 25–9, 12–6 in Big 12 play to finish in second place.  They defeated Texas, Oklahoma, and Kansas to become champions of the Big 12 Conference tournament to earn and automatic bid to the NCAA tournament. In the NCAA Tournament they were upset by UAB in the second round.

After months of speculation, it was announced on June 2, 2015, that Fred Hoiberg would be accepting the head coach position with the Chicago Bulls of the NBA.

On June 8, 2015, it was announced that Iowa State would be hiring Murray State head coach Steve Prohm for the same position.

Offseason departures

Recruiting

Prep recruits

Incoming transfers

Roster

Schedule and results

|-
!colspan=12 style=""| Exhibition
|-

|-
!colspan=12 style=""| Regular season
|-

|-

|-

|-

|-

|-

|-

|-

|-

|-

|-

|-

|-
!colspan=12 style=""| Big 12 Tournament
|-

|-
!colspan=12 style=""| NCAA Tournament
|-

|-

Rankings

Awards and honors

All-Americans

Georges Niang (2nd Team)

Senior CLASS All-American

Georges Niang

Big 12 Newcomer of the Year

Deonte Burton

Academic All-Big 12 First Team

Matt Thomas (basketball)

All-Conference Selections

Georges Niang (1st Team)
Monté Morris (1st Team)
Jameel McKay (Honorable Mention)
Abdel Nader (Honorable Mention)
Matt Thomas (Honorable Mention)

Big 12 Player of the Week

Monté Morris (November 29)
Jameel McKay (December 13)
Monté Morris (January 24)

References

Iowa State Cyclones men's basketball seasons
Iowa State
Iowa State
Iowa State Cyc
Iowa State Cyc